Annia Stephany Mejía Alcaraz (born March 12, 1996) is an American-born Mexican footballer who plays as a centre back for Liga MX Femenil side Pachuca and the Mexico women's national team.

International career
Mejía's father attempted her to represent his homeland Honduras, but contacts with the local federation and one of its women's national team players were unsuccessful.

Mejía represented her mother's homeland Mexico at the 2015 CONCACAF Women's U-20 Championship and the 2016 FIFA U-20 Women's World Cup. She made her senior debut on 26 January 2016.

References

External links
 
 
 Annia Mejía at La Preferente 
 

1996 births
Living people
Citizens of Mexico through descent
Mexican women's footballers
Women's association football central defenders
Mexico women's international footballers
Mexican people of Honduran descent
Fundación Albacete players
Sporting de Gijón (women) players
Liga MX Femenil players
C.F. Monterrey (women) players
Mexican expatriate women's footballers
Mexican expatriate sportspeople in Spain
Expatriate women's footballers in Spain
American women's soccer players
Soccer players from Los Angeles
Sportspeople from San Bernardino County, California
American sportspeople of Mexican descent
American people of Honduran descent
California Golden Bears women's soccer players
American expatriate women's soccer players
American expatriate sportspeople in Spain